AARP (formerly called the American Association of Retired Persons) is an interest group in the United States focusing on issues affecting those over the age of fifty. The organization said it had more than 38 million members in 2018. The magazine and bulletin it sends to its members are the two largest-circulation publications in the United States.

AARP was formed in 1958 by Ethel Percy Andrus, a retired educator from California, and Leonard Davis, who later founded the Colonial Penn Group of insurance companies. It is an influential lobbying group in the United States. AARP sells paid memberships, and markets insurance and other services to its members.

History
According to the group's official history, AARP evolved from the National Retired Teachers Association (NRTA), which  Dr. Ethel Percy Andrus  had established in 1947 to promote her philosophy of productive aging, and to promote health insurance for retired teachers. In seeking group insurance coverage for retired teachers, Andrus was rejected by dozens of private insurance companies, which at the time deemed adults over age 65 to be "uninsurable." In 1955, Continental Casualty Co. agreed to offer coverage to retired teachers in New York State. The experiment was a financial success, and three years later, the NRTA Health Plan was expanded nationally. In 1958, Dr. Andrus created the American Association of Retired Persons (AARP) as a sister organization to NRTA. Through membership in AARP, the general population age 55 and older gained access to the insurance benefits previously limited to former teachers. Dr. Andrus continued to run AARP until 1967 when she died of a heart attack at age 82. Today, the NRTA is a division within AARP.

Other sources offer an alternative version of the group's origins. 60 Minutes reported in a 1978 exposé that AARP had been established as a marketing device by Leonard Davis, founder of the Colonial Penn Group insurance companies, after he met Ethel Percy Andrus. According to critics, until the 1980s AARP was controlled by Davis, who promoted its image as a non-profit advocate of retirees in order to sell insurance to members. AARP severed ties with Davis in 1979 and began dropping Colonial Penn products. AARP sought competitive bids for insurance coverage and in 1981 chose Prudential Insurance Company of America to underwrite the group health plan for AARP members.

The organization was originally named the American Association of Retired Persons, but in 1999, it officially changed its name to "AARP" (pronounced one letter at a time, "ay ay ar pee"), to reflect that its focus was no longer American retirees. AARP no longer requires that members be retired, and there are no longer any age restrictions even for full membership.

Overview

AARP addresses issues affecting older Americans through lobbying efforts at the state and national governmental level, an activity permitted by its 501(c)(4) status. The organization says that it is non-partisan and does not support, oppose or give money to any candidates or political parties. The total revenue for 2006 was approximately $1 billion, and it spent $23 million on lobbying. Middle-class security has been a major focus for the organization in recent years. AARP also provides extensive consumer information, volunteer opportunities, and events including an annual National Event & Expo.

AARP launched Life Reimagined in May 2013, calling it a "first-of-its-kind series of online and offline experiences that guide people through life transitions by helping them discover new possibilities and connect with a community of people pursuing similar passions and goals". USA Today called the initiative "the latest step for the AARP ... as it continues to rebrand itself and become the go-to address for feeling good about aging".

Board of directors
The membership of the board of directors is kept up to date on the AARP Web site.

Advocacy

Health care
AARP has been active in healthcare policy debates since the 1960s, and its recent engagement is a reflection of this long-standing involvement.

AARP testified before Congress in support of the Older Americans Act and the amendments to Social Security that created the Medicare Program, which President Johnson enacted into law in 1965.

AARP's public stances influenced the United States Congress' passage of the Medicare Prescription Drug, Improvement, and Modernization Act, which created Medicare Part D, in 2003, and also influenced Congress by resisting changes to Social Security in 2005. AARP also addressed health care issues in their campaign targeting the 2008 elections with Divided We Fail.

In a 2003 editorial in the Los Angeles Times, critic Dale Van Atta wrote that AARP was doing unauthorized lobbying for its membership and was lobbying against the best interests of its membership. He said that by lobbying for the Medicare Prescription Drug, Improvement, and Modernization Act, AARP leaders had betrayed the membership.

By 2009, more than 50 million Americans were without health insurance coverage at some point during the year. AARP backed the Affordable Care Act (ACA) proposed by President Obama.  In early 2017, AARP strongly opposed the American Health Care Act of 2017, saying that older Americans would be unfairly burdened with higher premiums and smaller tax credits. In 2017, AARP successfully opposed legislative efforts to repeal the ACA.

Health insurance
Approximately seven million people have AARP-branded health insurance, including drug coverage and Medigap, as of April 2007 and the association earns more income from selling insurance to members than from membership dues. In 2008, AARP began offering new health insurance products: an HMO for Medicare recipients, in partnership with UnitedHealth Group; and a PPO and "a high-deductible insurance policy that could be used with a health savings account" to people aged 50–64, in partnership with Aetna.

While AARP is not an insurer, it allows its name to be used by insurance companies in the sale of products, for which it is paid a commission.

In a November 2008 editorial, The Des Moines Register and the Canada Free Press called AARP a lobbying group masquerading as a non-profit, meanwhile charging high membership fees and selling expensive private health care plans.

Senator Chuck Grassley (R-Iowa), senior Republican on the Senate Finance Committee, said in 2008 that the "limited benefit" insurance plans offered by AARP through UnitedHealth provided inadequate coverage and were marketed deceptively. One plan offered $5,000 for surgery that may cost two or three times that amount.

AARP markets self-branded Medigap policies. As of October 2009, Medical care reform contained a proposal to trim an associated program Medicare Advantage, which was expected to increase demand for Medigap policies. However, as cited above, AARP also brands a Medicare Advantage plan (MedicareComplete), and would also be subject to cuts under health care reform. According to an Annenberg Public Policy Center report, critics have said AARP had a conflict of interest in supporting the Act, because it "derives income from the sale of health and life insurance policies", by licensing its brand to insurance dealers such as New York Life, and would benefit financially from passage of the legislation.

In 2004, BusinessWeek said questions have arisen in the past about whether AARP's commercial interests may conflict with those of its membership, and characterizes many of the funds and insurance policies that AARP markets as providing considerably less benefit than seniors could get on their own.

Single-payer
Single-payer advocates have criticized AARP for not supporting the single-payer or public option during the health care debate. Single-payer advocates supported H.R. 676, proposed by Rep. John Conyers (D-MI). AARP released a statement explaining to its members why the organization was not supporting H.R. 676:

Starting over with a new, "single-payer" program will not eliminate the problems Medicare, Medicaid, and SCHIP currently face, such as the spiraling costs of procedures and prescription medications, as well as technological advances that are often not comprehensively tested to be proven safe or effective before marketing. H.R. 676 does not address the problem of increasing healthcare costs. Rather, it allows costs to continue to grow, which will result in unaffordable coverage.

John Rother, AARP's former chief lobbyist, said the single-payer model would "disrupt the system that is currently in place" and "require a very significant tax increase". But Rother admitted that it would be possible to design a system that would avoid these problems. Since AARP's priorities now are to protect the current programs and implement the Affordable Care Act, Rother said that any effort to promote single-payer would be undercutting health reform. Rother said: "To go to a single-payer, you do have to trust government. The climate we're in right now is a very hostile climate for something like that."

Rother also thought that an educational effort on the benefits of single-payer would undercut the ACA. AARP has not published any material relating to single-payer health insurance on its website, in its several hundred-page policy book, or through its Public Policy Institute.

Approximately 60,000 AARP members quit AARP between July 1 and August 18, 2009, in a controversy that arose over AARP's support for U.S. health care reform. FOX News stated: "The Atlanta-based American Seniors Association, which is opposed to President Obama's health care plan, is trying to capitalize on growing public dissatisfaction with the AARP." AARP spokesman Drew Nannis responded that AARP loses about 300,000 members a month on average, and the controversial 60,000 of those that had left had specified leaving over the health care debate. Nannis also stated that the AARP gained 400,000 members and that 1.5 million members renewed their memberships within the same period of time.
The American Seniors Association is a for-profit organization operated by the American Seniors Association Holding Group, Inc (ASAHG, Inc).

Social Security
Since March 2012, AARP's "You've Earned a Say" campaign has sought to foster nonpartisan conversations about how to strengthen Social Security and Medicare. The Richmond (VA) Times-Dispatch reported: "AARP took the debate about Medicare and Social Security from what it called behind closed doors in Washington to a series of town hall meetings around the country to make sure retirees have a voice in the discussion."

In June 2011, AARP dropped its long-standing opposition to cutting Social Security benefits. A news release emphasized that "AARP has not changed its position on Social Security". In 2005, AARP led the effort to kill President George W. Bush's plan for partial privatization. AARP now has concluded that change is inevitable, and it wants to be at the table to try to minimize the pain. John Rother, AARP's policy chief and a prime mover for the new position, said: "The ship was sailing. I wanted to be at the wheel when that happens." AARP declined to join a coalition of about 300 unions, women's groups, and liberal advocacy organizations created to fight Social Security benefit cuts. Rother said, "The coalition's role was to kind of anchor the left, and our role is going to be to actually get something done".

Age discrimination

AARP advocated for the Age Discrimination in Employment Act of 1967 and the Age Discrimination Act of 1975. In 2009, AARP backed the Protecting Older Workers Against Discrimination Act (POWADA), which aims to restore fairness for workers 40 and older by treating age discrimination as seriously as other forms of workplace discrimination.

Affiliates

AARP has several affiliated organizations, including:
 AARP Foundation, a 501(c)(3) non-profit charity that helps people over age 50 who are at social and economic risk; it includes:
 AARP Experience Corps, a 501(c)(3) non-profit charity that encourages people over age 50 to mentor and tutor school children;
 AARP Institute, a non-profit charity that holds some of AARP's charitable gift annuity funds;
 AARP Services, Inc., a for-profit corporation that provides quality control and research,
 Legal Counsel for the Elderly, a 501(c)(3) non-profit charity that provides legal assistance to seniors in Washington, D.C.
 AARP Financial Services Corporation, a for-profit corporation that holds AARP's real estate;
 AARP Insurance Plan, an organization that holds some of AARP's group health insurance policies;

Because of AARP's sizable membership, it is able to generate its own income without being dependent on government grants or private donors, though it receives help from both of these for specific programs. According to its 2018 Consolidated Financial Statement, the largest sources of income were:
 royalties for the rights to use AARP's intellectual property (name, logo, etc.) paid by commercial providers of products, services and discounts for AARP members $908,960,000;
 membership dues $301,017,000;
 advertisements placed in its publications $147,687,000; and
 total operating revenue $1,648,795,000

AARP Services, Inc. and AARP Financial Incorporated
AARP Services, Inc., founded in 1999, is a wholly-owned taxable subsidiary of AARP that manages the range of products and services offered as benefits to members. Its offers include Medicare supplemental insurance; member discounts on rental cars, cruises, vacation packages, and lodging; special offers on technology and gifts; pharmacy services; legal services; and long-term care insurance. AARP Services founded AARP Financial Incorporated, a subsidiary that manages AARP-endorsed financial products including AARP Funds. In a filing with the Securities and Exchange Commission in June 2010, AARP Financial announced the discontinuation of AARP Funds. AARP Services develops new products, manages and markets products and services, and creates and maintains partnership and sponsorship relationships.

AARP Foundation
AARP Foundation is AARP's affiliated charity. Foundation programs provide security, protection, and empowerment for older persons in need. Low-income older workers receive the job training and placement they need to rejoin the workforce. Free tax preparation is provided for low- and moderate-income individuals, with special attention to those 60 and older. The Foundation's litigation staff protects the legal rights of older Americans in critical health, long-term care, consumer, and employment situations. Additional programs provide information, education, and services to ensure that people over 50 lead lives of independence, dignity, and purpose. Foundation programs are funded by grants, tax-deductible contributions, and AARP.

The AARP Foundation's website claims the non-profit "wants to win back opportunity for those now in crisis, so thousands of vulnerable low-income Americans 50+ can regain their foothold, continue to serve as anchors for their families and communities, and ensure that their best life is still within reach". Key areas of focus are hunger, income, housing, and isolation. The Foundation's vision is "a country that is free of poverty where no older person feels vulnerable".

One of the goals of the AARP Foundation is its Drive to End Hunger. In 2011, AARP and AARP Foundation formed a relationship with NASCAR driver Jeff Gordon and Hendrick Motorsports to increase awareness of hunger in America with the No. 24 Drive to End Hunger race car and related food drives. Through the Drive to End Hunger program, AARP also sponsored Hendrick driver Kasey Kahne, beginning in 2016.

Charity Navigator rated the AARP Foundation overall at 91.22 out of 100 possible points (a "four-star" rating), giving it a financial rating of 88.26 out of 100 ("three stars") and an accountability and transparency rating of 96.00 ("four stars") for its fiscal year 2017.

AARP Driver Safety
In 1979, AARP introduced the nation's first driver safety course geared towards older adults. AARP Driver Safety, which can be completed in a classroom setting or online, teaches defensive driving techniques and provides "added information on age-related cognitive and physical changes that affect driving". The course is instructed and promoted by volunteers throughout the U.S.

In addition to course fees, the program is supported by a grant from the automobile manufacturer, Toyota. Over a half million drivers completed the course in 2012 and over 15 million people completed the courses since 1979.

AARP publications and broadcasts
AARP The Magazine, with a circulation of approximately 37 million, and the AARP Bulletin with 30 million as of 2016, are the two largest-circulation publications in the United States.
AARP The Magazine (known until 2002 as Modern Maturity), is a lifestyle magazine for people 50+. Established in 1958, the magazine is distributed bi-monthly to AARP members. Other publications include AARP Bulletin and The Journal. In 2018, the digital publication titled Sisters from AARP was launched, aimed at African American women.

The organization also produces radio and television programs and has a book division.

AARP en Español is AARP's Spanish-language multimedia platform. Offerings include a Spanish-language website, a Spanish-language YouTube channel, and informational resources.

Criticism
Criticism has been leveled at the salaries that AARP staff earn, and the use of first-class and business-class travel for short trips. According to AARP's 2014 IRS annual return, Chief Executive Officer Addison B. Rand received $1,698,289 of salary and benefits from AARP and its subsidiaries. Board members, officers, and key employees flew first class on flights longer than five hours unless business class was available. The Chief Executive Officer flew first-class on flights longer than 90 minutes. AARP reported that it had spent $8,694,890 on the compensation of its officers, directors, and key employees during 2014.

Senate investigation 
In 1995, Senator Alan K. Simpson launched an investigation into AARP's books, financial interests, and hiring practices. He described AARP as "a vast empire that has figured out how to gimmick the nonprofit laws" describing the organization as "33 million people paying $8 dues, bound together by a common love of airline discounts and automobile discounts and pharmacy discounts," and that members "haven't the slightest idea what the organization is asking for."

The investigations did not reveal sufficient evidence to change the organization's status.

Class action lawsuits 
In 2018 and 2019, several class action lawsuits were filed against AARP regarding insurance policies. One lawsuit is over undisclosed licensing revenue that AARP earned from AARP-branded Medigap insurance policies. Another lawsuit claims that AARP acted as an insurance agent or an insurance broker, neither of which AARP is licensed to be, for AARP-branded Medigap insurance policies. In another lawsuit, the plaintiff said that AARP should not have used its status to claim the AARP-branded insurance policies were "best for seniors".

All the lawsuits were dismissed.

AARP Awards
 The Inspire Awards "honor 10 people over age 50 each year who continue to make a significant impact". Past recipients include: Maya Angelou, Caroline Kennedy, Jane Goodall, Steve Jobs, Daniel Inouye, Emilio Estefan, Toby Keith, Joy Behar, Henry Winkler, Elizabeth Warren, and Tony Danza.
 The Movies for Grownups Awards "recognizes achievements of those in the entertainment industry age 50 and over, and the films that speak to that vast audience", as well as supports the overall goals of the AARP. Past recipients include Denzel Washington, Annette Bening, Jeff Bridges, Viola Davis, Morgan Freeman, Michael Douglas, and Lily Tomlin.
 The Sexiest Stars Awards "honor 50 Sexiest People Over 50" The bimonthly magazine by the American Association of Retired Persons selected celebrities such as Pam Grier, Tina Turner, Quincy Jones, Harry Belafonte, Phylicia Rashad, Kathleen Battle, Lena Horne, Sidney Poitier.

See also

References

Further reading

External links
 AARP Spanish-language website
 AARP Spanish-language YouTube channel

 
Financial services companies established in 1958
Health care companies established in 1958
1958 establishments in Washington, D.C.
501(c)(4) nonprofit organizations
Lobbying organizations in the United States
Magazine publishing companies of the United States
Organizations established in 1958
Political advocacy groups in the United States
Retirement in the United States
Seniors' organizations
Organizations based in Washington, D.C.